Offenbach-Kaiserlei station is a railway station in the municipality of Offenbach am Main, located in Hesse, Germany.

References

Rhine-Main S-Bahn stations
Kaiserlei
Buildings and structures in Offenbach am Main